The 2022 SummerSlam was the 35th annual SummerSlam professional wrestling pay-per-view (PPV) and livestreaming event produced by WWE. It was held for wrestlers from the promotion's Raw and SmackDown brand divisions. The event took place on Saturday, July 30, 2022, at Nissan Stadium in Nashville, Tennessee, marking the first and only SummerSlam to not be held during the month of August. This was also the first WWE PPV and livestreaming event following the retirement of WWE owner Vince McMahon, who had served as Chairman and Chief Executive Officer of the company since 1982. McMahon announced his retirement on July 22, eight days before SummerSlam. However, he returned as Executive Chairman on January 10, 2023.

Eight matches were contested at the event. In the main event, Roman Reigns defeated Brock Lesnar in a Last Man Standing match to retain the Undisputed WWE Universal Championship, which was billed as their final match against each other. In other prominent matches, Pat McAfee defeated Happy Corbin, Logan Paul defeated The Miz, The Usos (Jey Uso and Jimmy Uso) defeated The Street Profits (Angelo Dawkins and Montez Ford) to retain the Undisputed WWE Tag Team Championship, and in the opening bout, Bianca Belair defeated Becky Lynch to retain the Raw Women's Championship. The event also saw the returns of Bayley, Dakota Kai (who had been released from her WWE contract in April), Io Shirai, and Edge.

The event received positive reviews from critics, who, along with fans, lauded the main event, and welcomed the new creative direction the company was taking. Praise was also directed to Logan Paul's performance and the Raw Women's Championship match, but criticism was directed at the Undisputed WWE Tag Team Championship match, the SmackDown Women's Championship match, and the United States Championship match.

Production

Background

SummerSlam is an annual professional wrestling event that had previously been produced every August by WWE since 1988. Dubbed "The Biggest Party of the Summer", it is one of the promotion's original four pay-per-views (PPV), along with WrestleMania, Royal Rumble, and Survivor Series, originally dubbed the "Big Four", and as of August 2021, it is considered one of the "Big Five", along with Money in the Bank. Out of the five, it is considered WWE's second biggest event of the year behind WrestleMania. Announced on October 25, 2021, the 2022 event was the first to not be held during the month of August. Instead, the 35th SummerSlam was scheduled to take place on Saturday, July 30, 2022, at the Nissan Stadium in Nashville, Tennessee. It featured wrestlers from the Raw and SmackDown brand divisions, and in addition to airing on traditional PPV, it was available to livestream on Peacock in the United States and the WWE Network in international markets. Tickets went on sale on April 22, with premium hospitality packages also available. It was also the first SummerSlam since 2009 to incorporate a new logo, replacing the previous SummerSlam logo that had been used for the past 12 years.

Eight days before SummerSlam on July 22, WWE owner Vince McMahon announced his retirement from the company. He had served as Chairman and Chief Executive Officer (CEO) since 1982. The 2022 SummerSlam was in turn the first WWE PPV and livestreaming event following his retirement. Stephanie McMahon and WWE President Nick Khan took over as co-CEOs, and the former also took over as Chairwoman of WWE. However, on January 10, 2023, Stephanie announced her resignation as co-CEO and Chairwoman, with Nick Khan being the sole CEO and Vince returning as Executive Chairman.

Storylines
The event included matches that resulted from scripted storylines, where wrestlers portrayed heroes, villains, or less distinguishable characters in scripted events that built tension and culminated in a wrestling match or series of matches. Results were predetermined by WWE's writers on the Raw and SmackDown brands, while storylines were produced on WWE's weekly television shows, Monday Night Raw and Friday Night SmackDown.

At WrestleMania 38 in April, SmackDown's Universal Champion Roman Reigns defeated Raw's WWE Champion Brock Lesnar in a Winner Takes All match to become recognized as the Undisputed WWE Universal Champion. After Reigns retained the Undisputed WWE Universal Championship on the June 17 episode of SmackDown, he claimed there was no one left to face him. Lesnar then made a surprise return after a two-month hiatus and offered Reigns a handshake. As Reigns went to shake his hand, Lesnar attacked Reigns and then attacked The Usos (Jey Uso and Jimmy Uso), who had come to Reigns' aid. It was subsequently announced that Reigns would defend the Undisputed WWE Universal Championship against Lesnar in a Last Man Standing match at SummerSlam, which WWE billed as their last match against each other.

On the June 17 episode of SmackDown, after losing to Madcap Moss, Happy Corbin confronted commentator Pat McAfee—a former teammate when both played in the National Football League who consistently criticized Corbin on-air for his underhanded tactics. The following week, McAfee challenged Corbin to a match at SummerSlam. After Money in the Bank went off the air, Corbin attacked McAfee and subsequently accepted the challenge.

At Money in the Bank, Bobby Lashley defeated Theory to win the United States Championship. On the following episode of Raw, Theory announced he was granted a rematch against Lashley for the title at SummerSlam.

At Money in the Bank, The Usos (Jey Uso and Jimmy Uso) defeated The Street Profits (Angelo Dawkins and Montez Ford) to retain the Undisputed WWE Tag Team Championship. Following the match, replayed footage of the pinfall showed that Ford's shoulder was off the mat, thus the pinfall should not have been counted. A championship rematch was then subsequently scheduled for SummerSlam. On the July 15 episode of SmackDown, after Dawkins defeated Jimmy despite Jimmy's shoulder being off the mat, WWE official Adam Pearce announced that WWE Hall of Famer and Nashville area native Jeff Jarrett would be the special guest referee for the match.

At Money in the Bank, Liv Morgan won the women's Money in the Bank ladder match to earn a contract for a women's championship match of her choosing. After Ronda Rousey retained the SmackDown Women's Championship later that same night, Morgan ran out and used the contract to cash in on Rousey and win the title. On the following SmackDown, it was announced that Morgan would defend the title in a rematch against Rousey at SummerSlam.

At WrestleMania 38, social media influencer Logan Paul teamed with The Miz in a tag team match in which they were victorious. However, unpleased that Paul scored the pinfall, Miz turned on and attacked Paul. In June, photos began surfacing of Paul training for an in-ring return and then on June 30, it was announced that Paul had officially signed with WWE. In a short video following the announcement, Paul said he was coming for The Miz. Paul then appeared on the July 18 episode of Raw to confront Miz and challenged him to a match at SummerSlam. Miz initially rejected, but after being goaded by Paul, Miz accepted.

At the previous year's SummerSlam, Becky Lynch made a return from maternity leave and faced Bianca Belair in an impromptu match where she defeated Belair in 26 seconds to win the SmackDown Women's Championship. The two would face each other again at WrestleMania 38, this time for Lynch's Raw Women's Championship, where Belair was victorious. Over the next few months, Lynch failed various attempts to regain the championship. On the July 11 episode of Raw, during Belair's title defense, Lynch caused Belair to lose via countout, but Belair retained the title. The following week, Lynch stated that whoever was the champion by the end of the night would defend the title against her at SummerSlam. Lynch then attacked Belair, with the women's championship match occurring immediately afterwards. Belair again retained, keeping her as the defending champion heading into her match against Lynch at SummerSlam, with Belair vowing to rewrite what happened at SummerSlam the previous year.

On the July 4 episode of Raw, The Mysterios (Rey Mysterio and Dominik Mysterio) took on Judgment Day members Damian Priest and Finn Bálor. Priest and Bálor attacked The Mysterios before the match began, but The Mysterios were still able to defeat Priest and Bálor with an Eddie Guerrero chair trick. The following week, Bálor and Priest confronted Dominik backstage, suggesting that he join The Judgment Day. This led to a match between Bálor and Rey, where Bálor won. On the July 18 episode, after Judgment Day again suggested Dominik join their group, Priest defeated Rey. After the match, Priest and Bálor threatened Rey with a Con-chair-to, but Dominik made the save. On the final Raw before SummerSlam, in what was Rey's 20 year anniversary of his WWE debut, Rey and Dominik defeated Bálor and Priest. While they were celebrating backstage, however, Priest and Rhea Ripley, also from Judgment Day, attacked them, with Priest sending Rey through a table. Later that night, a No Disqualification tag team match pitting The Mysterios against Bálor and Priest was made official for SummerSlam.

Event

Preliminary matches
The pay-per-view opened with Bianca Belair defending the Raw Women's Championship against Becky Lynch. Early in the match, Belair accidentally legitimately dislocated Lynch's shoulder. Outside the ring, Lynch countered a Kiss of Death from Belair and attacked Belair near the timekeeper's area. Lynch performed Diamond Dust on Belair for a nearfall. Later, Belair performed a Kiss Of Death on Lynch outside the ring. Belair intended for a countout victory, however, Lynch rolled back in the ring at nine. Lynch pulled Belair, who was atop a turnbuckle, into the ring by the latter's braid and performed a Manhandle Slam for a nearfall. In the closing moments, as Lynch attempted a second Manhandle Slam from the middle rope, Belair countered into a Spanish Fly and the Kiss of Death on Lynch to retain the title. Following the match, Belair and Lynch shook hands and embraced each other. Bayley then made her return for the first time since July 2021 to confront Belair. She was accompanied by a returning Dakota Kai (who had been released from her WWE contract in April) and Io Shirai (in her first appearance since NXT Stand & Deliver, who was billed under the new ring name "Iyo Sky"), both making their main roster debuts. Sky and Kai turned into villainesses. by siding with Bayley, who attempted to taunt Belair. Lynch then sided with Belair, thus Lynch turning face for the first time since August 2021. Bayley, Sky, and Kai then retreated while Lynch and Belair continued to show mutual respect to each other.

Next, Logan Paul faced The Miz (accompanied by Maryse and Ciampa). During the match, Paul applied the figure-four leglock on Miz, however, Miz reached the ropes to void the submission. Paul performed a Crossbody and standing moonsault on Miz for a nearfall. Ciampa attempted to attack Paul only for the referee to catch him. Although the referee sent Ciampa backstage, Ciampa refused to comply and obtained a steel chair to sit. AJ Styles then came out and attacked Ciampa from behind. Paul performed a Phenomenal Forearm on Miz for a nearfall. Paul then performed a Frog Splash on Miz through the announce table. In the end, as Paul attempted a pin on Miz, Maryse distracted the referee. As Miz attempted to attack Paul with a necklace, he almost struck Maryse, who stood on the ring apron, however, Paul took advantage and performed a Skull Crushing Finale on Miz in the ring to win the match.

After that, Bobby Lashley defended the United States Championship against Theory. During Lashley's entrance, Theory attacked Lashley with the Money in the Bank briefcase. Midway through the match, Theory attempted to walk away from the match, however, Lashley intercepted him. Lashley performed a Running Powerslam on Theory. As Lashley attempted a spear on Theory, Theory leapt over Lashley. In the end, Lashley applied the Hurt Lock on Theory, who submitted, thus Lashley retained the title.

The next match saw The Mysterios (Rey Mysterio and Dominik Mysterio) face The Judgment Day (Finn Bálor and Damian Priest, accompanied by Rhea Ripley) in a No Disqualification tag team match. In the closing moments, former Judgment Day leader Edge made his return and performed a Spear on Priest and Bàlor. The Mysterios then performed a double 619 on Bàlor. Rey followed with a Frog Splash on Bálor to win the match.

Next, Happy Corbin fought Pat McAfee. In the closing moments, as Corbin attempted End of Days on McAfee, McAfee performed a right hand on Corbin, who inadvertently incapacitated the referee. McAfee performed a low blow and a Powerbomb on Corbin to win the match.

Following that, Drew McIntyre came out to cut a promo where he spoke about his upcoming Undisputed WWE Universal Championship match at Clash at the Castle. McIntyre stated that it did not matter who won the main event that night as he would defeat them at Clash at the Castle to become champion.

Next, The Usos (Jey Uso and Jimmy Uso) defended the Undisputed WWE Tag Team Championship against The Street Profits (Angelo Dawkins and Montez Ford), with WWE Hall of Famer Jeff Jarrett as the special guest referee. In the end, The Usos performed the 1D on Dawkins to retain the titles.

Following that, Matt Riddle came out and called out Seth "Freakin" Rollins; they were originally scheduled to face each other at SummerSlam, however, Riddle was injured by Rollins on the Raw before the event, thus Riddle was not medically cleared. Rollins came out, however, WWE officials came out to warn Rollins. Rollins and Riddle eventually fought which ended with Rollins performing a Stomp on Riddle. It was later revealed that this match was cancelled due to Riddle failing a drug test.

In the penultimate match, Liv Morgan defended the SmackDown Women's Championship against Ronda Rousey. Early in the match, Morgan performed a Codebreaker on Rousey. As Morgan attempted an Ob-Livion on Rousey, Rousey countered and applied the armbar on Morgan only for Morgan to reach the ropes to void the submission. In the closing moments, as Rousey applied the armbar on Morgan once again, Rousey's shoulders were on the mat. The referee counted the pin, however, he did not notice Morgan tap out before the three count, thus Morgan retained the title. Following the match, an irate Rousey attacked Morgan and the referee, turning heel for the first time since 2019.

Main event
In the main event, Roman Reigns (accompanied by Paul Heyman) defended the Undisputed WWE Universal Championship against Brock Lesnar in a Last Man Standing match. Lesnar drove a tractor towards the ring for his entrance. Lesnar jumped off the tractor onto Reigns and performed German Suplexes on Reigns at ringside. As Heyman distracted Lesnar, Reigns took advantage and performed a Samoan Drop on Lesnar through a table set up at ringside, who stood up at seven. Reigns put Lesnar through another table, who stood up at seven. Reigns performed two Superman Punches and a spear on Lesnar, who stood up at seven. Lesnar attempted an F-5 on Reigns, however, Reigns countered and threw Lesnar out of the ring. Lesnar attacked Reigns with the steel steps and a broken piece of a table, who got up at nine. Lesnar threw Reigns in the front loader of the tractor and dumped Reigns back in the ring, after which, Lesnar performed German Suplexes on Reigns, who got up at eight. Lesnar then performed an F-5 on Reigns, who got up at nine. As Lesnar attempted another F-5 on Reigns, Reigns countered into the Guillotine, however, Lesnar countered into his own Guillotine on Reigns, who got up at nine. Lesnar then drove the tractor into the ring, lifting the ring, toppling Reigns, who got up at nine. The Usos (Jey Uso and Jimmy Uso) then came out to aid Reigns and attacked Lesnar, however, Lesnar took out The Usos. Heyman then taunted Lesnar with the titles, who responded by performing an F-5 on Heyman through the announce table. Reigns speared a distracted Lesnar and moments later, Austin Theory came out with his Money in the Bank briefcase and attempted to cash in, however, Lesnar intercepted Theory with an F-5. The Usos then performed superkicks on Lesnar, who got up at nine. Reigns performed a Spear on Lesnar, who got up at nine. An irate Reigns attacked Lesnar with Theory's Money in the Bank briefcase, who still stood up at nine. Reigns then struck Lesnar with the WWE title belt, who stood up at nine. In the closing moments, Reigns attacked Lesnar, this time with the Universal title belt, and proceeded with The Usos to place pieces of the broken announce table, steel chairs and amplifier on a battered Lesnar and stood on the debris for the ten count.

Reception
The event was met with positive reviews from critics, who welcomed the company's new creative direction. The Reigns vs. Lesnar main event was also highly acclaimed and was met with a four-and-a-half star rating out of a possible five by Dave Meltzer. WWE reported on the Raw after SummerSlam that it had surpassed 1.3 billion video views on social media for the event. Brent Brookhouse of CBS Sports praised the event and also gave his highest ratings of letter grade A to the Reigns vs. Lesnar main event match.

Aftermath
The 2022 SummerSlam would be the only SummerSlam to take place in July, as the following year's event returned to August.

Raw
After SummerSlam, the trio of Bayley, Dakota Kai, and Iyo Sky would dub themselves as Damage CTRL, and they continued to target Raw Women's Champion Bianca Belair. This led to a six-woman tag team match at Clash at the Castle, where Damage CTRL defeated Belair's team in which Bayley pinned Belair. Due to pinning the champion, Bayley challenged Belair to a ladder match for the title at Extreme Rules, and Belair accepted.

On the August 15 episode of Raw, Matt Riddle revealed that he was medically cleared. Later that same night, Riddle engaged into another brawl with Seth "Freakin" Rollins before challenging him to a match at Clash at the Castle, which was made official.

After SummerSlam, The Mysterios (Rey Mysterio and Dominik Mysterio) and Edge continued feuding with The Judgment Day (Finn Bálor, Damian Priest, and Rhea Ripley), leading to Edge and Rey teaming up to face Bálor and Priest at Clash at the Castle. At the event, Edge and Rey defeated Judgment Day, but after the match, Dominik turned on both Edge and Rey and joined The Judgment Day.

SmackDown
On the following episode of SmackDown, Ronda Rousey was suspended for her actions at SummerSlam. Later that night, Shayna Baszler won a gauntlet match to become the number one contender for Liv Morgan's SmackDown Women's Championship at Clash at the Castle, where Morgan retained. After Rousey's suspension was lifted, she won a fatal five-way elimination match on the September 9 episode to earn a rematch against Morgan for the SmackDown Women's Championship at Extreme Rules. The following week, Morgan decided that she wanted to defend the title against Rousey in an Extreme Rules match, and Rousey accepted.

Results

References

External links
 

2022
2022 WWE Network events
2022 WWE pay-per-view events
Professional wrestling in Tennessee
Events in Nashville, Tennessee
Events in Tennessee
July 2022 events in the United States